The World Group Play-offs were four ties which involved the losing nations of the World Group first round and the winning nations of the World Group II. Nations that won their play-off ties entered the 2006 World Group, while losing nations joined the 2006 World Group II.

Switzerland vs. Austria

Belgium vs. Argentina

Croatia vs. Germany

Czech Republic vs. Italy

References

See also
Fed Cup structure

World Group Play-offs